Penicillium vinaceum is an anamorph species of fungus in the genus Penicillium which produces penicillivinacine, vinaxanthone and citrmycetin.

References

Further reading 
 
 
 

vinaceum
Fungi described in 1927